The Wichita Falls Fever was an American soccer club based in Wichita Falls, Texas that was a member of the Lone Star Soccer Alliance.

Year-by-year

Lone Star Soccer Alliance teams
Defunct soccer clubs in Texas
Sports in Wichita Falls, Texas
1989 establishments in Texas
1992 disestablishments in Texas
Association football clubs established in 1989
Association football clubs disestablished in 1992